NBA Fastbreak is a 1997 pinball machine released by Williams Electronics Games (under the Bally brand name).

Gameplay
The scoring is like the real NBA, meaning that 300 points is a terrific score. The scoring is balanced, and completely linear. It is the only WPC machine that does not feature an after ball bonus count. The objective of NBA Fastbreak is to get to Trophy Multiball by completing six tasks, win a championship ring, and score as many points as possible along the way. The six tasks are:

Goals (2PT, 3PT & Free Throw)
20 points
Combos (Tip-Off, Slam Dunk, Alley Oop & Fastbreak)
Stadium Goodies (Crazy Bob's Concessions, Hot-Dog Mania, Scoreboard Trivia & Egyptian Soda)
Multiballs (Shoot Around Multiball & Around The World Multiball)
Power Hoops and Power Points (Half Court Hoops, Hook Shot Hoops, Run & Shoot Hoops & Hoops Multiball)

When all the tasks are completed, Trophy Multiball automatically starts (if the player loses the ball before it starts, it will start on the next ball). The player then has unlimited balls for about 20 seconds. The center ramp is lit for 2 points and the goal is to outscore the "other team" (it seems that 6 or 7 shots are necessary to do this). If the player wins, a championship ring is awarded and the player becomes the current MVP.

External links
Internet Pinball Database listing for NBA Fastbreak
Recent Auction Results for NBA Fastbreak
NBA Fastbreak promo video

1997 pinball machines
Bally pinball machines
National Basketball Association mass media